Euderia squamosa is a species of beetles. It is the only member of the monotypic genus Euderia and subfamily Euderiinae.

References
  1880: Manual of the New Zealand Coleoptera. Government Printer, Wellington.
  1961: Considerations on the genera Endecatomus Mellié and Euderia Broun (Coleoptera: Bostrychidae), with descriptions of their larvae. Proceedings of the Royal Entomological Society of London (B), 30: 113–120.

Bibliography

  

Bostrichidae